The 2014 Alltech FEI World Equestrian Games were held in the region of Normandy, France. It was the seventh edition of the Games, which are held every four years and run by the International Federation for Equestrian Sports (FEI). For team events in the dressage, eventing, and show jumping disciplines, these Games were the first qualifying event for the 2016 Summer Olympics.

Venues and disciplines
Competition venues in the Normandy region hosted the following disciplines:
 Caen
 D'Ornano Stadium – Jumping, Dressage, and Eventing (stadium jumping phase only)
 Hippodrome de la Prairie (Prairie Racecourse) – Para-equestrian Dressage, and the first venue for Combined driving
 Zénith Indoor Arena – Vaulting and Reining
 Valley of the River Orne – second venue for Driving
 Mont Saint-Michel Bay – Endurance
 Le Pin National Stud – Eventing (cross-country and dressage phases)
 Deauville – Polo demonstration
 Saint-Lô – Horseball demonstration

Schedule
All times are Central European Summer Time (UTC+2)

Dressage

Driving

Endurance

Eventing

Jumping

Reining

Vaulting

Para-Dressage

Officials
Appointment of (Olympic disciplines) officials is as follows:

Dressage
  Isabelle Judet (Ground Jury President)
  Dietrich Plewa (Ground Jury Member)
  Francis Verbeek- van Rooij (Ground Jury Member)
  Stephen Clarke (Ground Jury Member)
  Liselotte Fore (Ground Jury Member)
  Elizabeth McMullen (Ground Jury Member)
  Susan Hoevenaars (Ground Jury Member)
  Maribel Alonso de Quinzanos (FEI Technical Delegate)

Jumping
  Kim Morrison (Ground Jury President)
  David M. Distler (Ground Jury Member)
  Rene Billardon (Ground Jury Member)
  Joao Moura (Ground Jury Member)
  Bruno Laubscher (Ground Jury Member)
  Santiago Varela Ullastres (FEI Technical Delegate)

Eventing
  Gillian Rolton (Ground Jury President)
  Alain James (Ground Jury Member)
  Ernst Topp (Ground Jury Member)
  Alec Lochore (FEI Technical Delegate)

Para-Dressage
  Anne Prain (Ground Jury President)
  Marco Orsini (Ground Jury Member)
  Freddy Leyman (Ground Jury Member)
  Eva Maria Bachinger (Ground Jury Member)
  Hanneke Gerritsen (Ground Jury Member)
  Alison Pauline King (Ground Jury Member)
  Kjell Myhre (Ground Jury Member)
  Sarah Leitch (Ground Jury Member)
  Marc Urban (FEI Technical Delegate)

Medal summary

Medalists

Medals table

Participating nations
74 nations participated at the games.

  Algeria (1)
  Argentina (14)
  Australia (41)
  Austria (36)
  Azerbaijan (1)
  Bahrain (5)
  Belarus (1)
  Belgium (29)
  Bermuda (1)
  Brazil (34)
  Canada (32)
  Chile (9)
  China (3)
  Chinese Taipei (1)
  Colombia (12)
  Costa Rica (5)
  Czech Republic (21)
  Denmark (21)
  Dominican Republic (2)
  Ecuador (3)
  Egypt (4)
  Estonia (3)
  Finland (17)
  France (54)
  Georgia (1)
  Germany (49)
  Great Britain (35)
  Greece (2)
  Guatemala (2)
  Hong Kong (9)
  Hungary (16)
  India (1)
  Ireland (20)
  Israel (3)
  Italy (42)
  Japan (11)
  Jordan (1)
  Kazakhstan (7)
  Latvia (2)
  Lithuania (1)
  Luxembourg (6)
  Malaysia (5)
  Mauritius (1)
  Mexico (8)
  Morocco (6)
  Netherlands (32)
  New Zealand (21)
  Norway (16)
  Oman (5)
  Palestine (1)
  Pakistan  (5)
  Peru (1)
  Poland (22)
  Portugal (17)
  Qatar (9)
  Russia (25)
  Saudi Arabia (3)
  Singapore (3)
  Slovakia (13)
  Slovenia (1)
  South Africa (23)
  South Korea (2)
  Spain (20)
  Sweden (36)
  Switzerland (37)
  Syria (3)
  Thailand (2)
  Tunisia (3)
  Turkey (2)
  Ukraine (7)
  United Arab Emirates (6)
  United States (49)
  Uruguay (7)
  Venezuela (4)
  Virgin Islands (1)

References

External links
FEI website
2014 World Equestrian Games official site

FEI World Equestrian Games
2014 in equestrian
2014 in French sport
Equestrian sports competitions in France
International sports competitions hosted by France
Sport in Normandy
Qualification tournaments for the 2015 Pan American Games
August 2014 sports events in Europe
September 2014 sports events in Europe
Horse driving competition
Para Dressage